George Radin (January 22, 1931 – May 21, 2013) was an American computer scientist. He gained his BA in English Literature from Brooklyn College in 1951, followed by an MA from Columbia University in 1952 and an MSc in mathematics from City University of New York in 1961. In 1963 he got a job with the  IBM Advanced Computer Utilization Department, where he helped develop the PL/I programming language and design the OS/360 and TSS/360 systems. In 1980, he was appointed an IBM Fellow.

References

American computer scientists
IBM Fellows
1931 births
2013 deaths
Brooklyn College alumni